Conch Reef is a coral reef located within the Florida Keys National Marine Sanctuary. It lies to the southeast of Plantation Key.  This reef is within a Sanctuary Preservation Area (SPA).  Adjacent to the SPA is a "Research Only" zone and the Aquarius underwater laboratory is at the center of the zone.  Outside of these zones is Conch Wall, a deep wall reef.

External links
 Contour map of Conch Reef, with Aquarius lab in center
 Benthic Habitat Map
 Video of Pillar coral at Conch Wall
 Barbara H. Lidz, Christopher D. Reich, and Eugene A. Shinn.  Systematic Mapping of Bedrock and Habitats along the Florida Reef Tract—Central Key Largo to Halfmoon Shoal (Gulf of Mexico).  USGS Professional Paper 1751 Tile 2, Conch Reef

References
 NOAA National Marine Sanctuary Maps, Florida Keys East
 NOAA website on Conch Reef
 NOAA Navigational Chart 11464

Coral reefs of the Florida Keys